Kath & Kim, (also written as Kath and Kim) is an Australian sitcom created by Jane Turner and Gina Riley, who portray the title characters of Kath Day-Knight, a cheery, middle-aged suburban mother, and Kim, her self-indulgent daughter. The cast also includes Glenn Robbins, Peter Rowsthorn and Magda Szubanski as, respectively, Kath's metrosexual boyfriend (later husband) Kel Knight, Kim's henpecked husband Brett Craig, and her lonely "second-best friend" Sharon Strzelecki. The series is set in Fountain Lakes, a fictional suburb of Melbourne, Victoria. 

Aside from the television series, which ran from 2002 to 2007 and comprises four seasons, the franchise also includes a television film, Da Kath & Kim Code (2005), and a feature film, Kath & Kimderella (2012). The series also spawned a short-lived American remake, which ran for 17 episodes between 2008 and 2009.

A two-part special to mark its 20th Anniversary, titled Kath & Kim: Our Effluent Life and Kath and Kim: 20 Preposterous Years, was screened on 20–21 November 2022.

Premise
Kath & Kim follows the day-to-day Australian suburban life of Kath Day-Knight (Jane Turner), her only child Kimberly (Kim) Diane Craig née Day (Gina Riley), Kim's husband and Computa City salesman, Brett Craig (Peter Rowsthorn), Kath's love interest and eventual husband who works as a "purveyor of fine meats", Kel Knight (Glenn Robbins), and long-time family friend Sharon Strzelecki (Magda Szubanski).

Storylines follow the characters' day-to-day lives, and document their personal struggles and the banality of their achievements and aspirations. Kath & Kim satirises the mother-daughter relationship and the habits and values of modern suburban Australians, and emphasises the kitsch and superficial elements of contemporary society, particularly the traditional working class which has progressed to a level of affluence (or "effluence" as quoted by Kath) which previous generations had been unable to achieve. Despite this affluence, good taste and a sense of cultural sophistication still eludes the titular characters.

They visit places such as the Westfield Fountain Gate (some parts filmed at Westfield Southland), the local IKEA, Target and various local restaurants.

It also occasionally mocks Australian and international mass popular culture, such as popular reality television shows Big Brother and Australian Idol. It sometimes makes statements about Australian politics. The crass and embarrassing behaviour of the characters, and their gaudy, out-dated fashion sense are popular features of the show. Processed and widely recognised Australian foods, such as Jatz crackers, Tim Tams and Fruche yoghurt are frequently referenced in the series.

During the credits, most episodes end with Kath and Kim sitting in Kath's back yard, chatting about issues related to the episode. Sometimes these chats help to complete the story which was told during the episode.

Cast and characters

Main cast
 Jane Turner as Kath Day-Knight – A middle aged woman who strives to keep herself fit.
 Gina Riley as Kim Craig – Kath's 20-something year old daughter who is known for being lazy and extremely self-centred.
 Magda Szubanski as Sharon Strzelecki – Kim's "second-best friend", described as very unlucky in love and a sports enthusiast.
 Glenn Robbins as Kel Knight – Kath's boyfriend and later husband, a metrosexual man who is a local "purveyor of fine meats"
 Peter Rowsthorn as Brett Craig – Kim's husband

Recurring cast
 Zara Harrington, Emma Le Boeuf and Makayla Berkers as Epponnee-Rae Craig – Kim's baby (series 2, episode 8 and onwards), and Morghyne de Vries played her as a young girl in the movie.
 Jane Turner and Gina Riley as Prue and Trude, two snobby women who work in a homewares store (8 episodes, TV movie, movie)
 Marg Downey as Marion, a new-age marriage celebrant and counsellor (6 episodes + movie)
 Mick Molloy as Gary Poole, Kim's father (2 episodes + movie)
 William McInnes (credited as Rock Hampton) as Sandy Freckle, long-time friend of Kel (2 episodes)
 Tony Martin as Mark, romantic interest of Sharon (4 episodes)
 Peta Brady as Kelly, Brett's supervisor at work (4 episodes + TV movie)
 Mark Trevorrow as Daryl Lee, a camp man who works in a menswear shop (3 episodes and TV movie). Trevorrow also plays a similar character in the movie.
 Luke Lennox as Brodie (1 episode + TV movie)
 Matt Lucas as Karen, Sharon's maternal half-sister (2 episodes)
 Shivantha Wijesinha as Imran (2 episodes)

Guest cast

 
Several guest stars are well-known Australian comedy performers, some of whom previously worked with Turner or Riley. Bublé and Lucas were fans of the show and asked to appear in it. Humphries declared himself a fan of the series before taking part.

Episodes

Overview
The storyline of the first series follows Kath's engagement and plans for her wedding to Kel. Kim frequently stays in her mother's house owing to her rocky relationship with Brett (most of which is due to her own childish, spoilt, and rude behaviour towards Brett). Sharon's always around with a helping hand and her own relationship problems. Her history with Brett is also explored.

The second series follows Kim's pregnancy and her rekindled relationship with Brett. Kath and Kel's relationship goes through some teething troubles. Kim and Brett have a baby in the final episode of the second series whom they name Epponnee Raelene Kathleen Darlene Charlene Craig, shortened to Epponnee Rae. Several episodes of the third series focus on Epponnee Rae. The third-season finale features an adult Epponnee Rae, played by Kylie Minogue.

Production

Development
The characters of Kath, Kim (created by Riley and Turner) and Sharon (created and played by Magda Szubanski) first featured in their current forms during the mid 1990s as a weekly segment of the Australian comedy series Big Girl's Blouse (Seven, 1994–95), having appeared in a more embryonic incarnation earlier in the decade on the sketch comedy show Fast Forward (Seven, 1989–92). They also appeared in Something Stupid (Seven, 1998). Robbins had also appeared on Fast Forward, while Rowsthorn and Robbins had previously worked together on The Comedy Company.

The skits were developed by Riley and Turner into a full series. Big Girl's Blouse had been deemed a failure by the ABC who wanted to pull Kath and Kim. But it was championed by Robyn Kershaw the ABC Head of Drama so Kath and Kim had the distinction for a comedy show of being produced by the drama department, and was loved by the "suburban people" it supposedly attacked.

Twenty-four episodes lasting approximately twenty-five minutes each across three seasons aired on ABC TV from 2002 to 2004. The series debuted on 15 May 2002 on the ABC Network with "Sex" and became one of the highest-rated shows for ABC. A replacement of a full series occurred in 2005 with the telemovie Da Kath & Kim Code. The fourth season of Kath & Kim began airing on the Seven Network on 19 August 2007, due to the contract expiring with ABC.

In late 2009, they announced that writing had begun on season 5, but by May 2010, Turner said: "We sort of felt like it was the end two years ago. We thought, 'We've done enough and the well is dry and we can't think of any more ideas' ... We think we might just leave it for now."

Writing
The alternative vocabulary including the mixed metaphors, hypercorrection, malapropisms, eggcorns (like "ravishing" instead of "ravenous"), and mis-pronunciations of the regular characters are much repeated by the show's fans. These include: "Look at moy" (look at me)—used by Kath to command attention during arguments, and "It's noice, different and unusual"—used by Kath, Kim and Sharon to express approval or agreement.

Filming
Kath's home, known as "Chateau Kath", was within the fictionalised suburb of Fountain Lakes, and served as the central filming location for the series. The home, located at 4 Lagoon Place, Patterson Lakes, Victoria, 35 km east of Melbourne, was originally rented by ABC during the entire run of the series, and chosen for its likeness to Sylvania Waters. The property backs onto a canal, which ABC fenced off during filming in order for it to look more suburban. It was sold in 2016 for $1,485,000. In May 2022, the house was in the process of being demolished, which was completed by July 2022.

Other footage was filmed around Cheltenham and Moorabbin; scenes set at Fountain Gate were actually filmed at Westfield Southland.

Costuming
Second-hand shops were used for Kath's clothing, whereas Kim was dressed in current trends.

Opening titles
The title sequence shows the main five regular characters over a white background. In season 3, it was amended to include Epponnee-Rae and Cujo, before switching to a revised version of the previous sequence for the Seven Network run, where Cujo was retained. The five regular cast members are then credited over aerial shots of suburban houses (Szubanski is credited as a "special guest" despite appearing in every episode) before fading into an aerial shot of Kath and Kim's house (some episodes replace it with an aerial shot of the mall, while "The Wedding" replaced it with a ground-level shot of a hospital). The theme song is "The Joker," performed by Gina Riley. A re-recording of it debuted in the telemovie opening sequence and was used for the show's run on the Seven Network.

Broadcast

First run
Kath & Kim was broadcast Thursday nights at 8.30 pm throughout its run on ABC, while Seven Network aired the series Sunday nights at 7.30 pm.

The series premiered in the United Kingdom in April 2004, when it was broadcast on the now-defunct subscription channel LivingTV, and later on Ftn. It made its terrestrial television debut when it screened on BBC Two from 12 May 2005. The fourth season has never been broadcast in the UK, but did premiere when it was made available on Netflix.

Re-runs
In 2017, the rights to the series were acquired by the Nine Network which began airing repeats of the series from 1 August 2017 until 21 November 2017.

In 2018, the series was released on Netflix in several regions, as well as the films and TV specials. In July 2019, the series was launched onto Netflix in Australia as well as the Kountdown Specials and Souvenir Editions.

In 2022, to mark its 20th anniversary the Seven Network began airing repeats of the series from 29 September 2022.

Reception

Ratings
Kath & Kim premiered on 16 May 2002 and became one of ABC's highest-rated shows. When the show premiered on the Seven Network, it became the highest-rating episode in Australian television history, until the record was broken by Nine Network's Underbelly: A Tale of Two Cities on 9 February 2009. The fourth season of Kath & Kim debuted with a record-breaking 2.511 million viewers peaking at 2.731 million. In its second and third episodes viewers fell to 1.994 & 1.817 million, respectively; however, viewers then rebounded for its fourth and fifth episodes with ratings of 2.047 and 2.157 million, respectively. Strong ratings continued with viewers of 2.049 and 2.066 million for the sixth and seventh episodes. The eighth episode and show's finale rated 2.338 million giving the fourth season an average viewership of 2.122 million, making it the highest-rating TV season in Australia for 2007 and the highest-rating of all four seasons of the show.

In 2007, Channel Seven started showing repeats of the show from season one onwards which had previously only aired on the ABC network. The repeats proved quite successful, with the first two rating 1.465 and 1.530 million, winning in a very competitive timeslot and being amongst the highest-rating shows of the week.

In the UK, its BBC premiere drew viewing figures of 1.691 million in May 2005.

Awards and nominations

Home media
The enduring public interest and popularity of Kath and Kim has led to a merchandising industry. The title family and supporting characters appear on everything from T-shirts to posters. The Kath & Kim series have been released on VHS (although titles are now discontinued in the VHS format) and DVD, in box sets and separate series editions in both region 4 (Australia, New Zealand, Latin America) as well as region 2 (Europe). The series has also had a CD release, featuring songs from the series and recordings from Kath and Kim. In addition, there has been clothing (such as aprons, T-shirts and oven mitts). Merchandise is available to purchase online, from the Kath & Kim official website.

DVD releases

CD releases
A CD, titled "Kath & Kim's Party Tape", was released on 2 May 2004. It reached #17 in the Australian Albums Chart and was certified Gold (50,000+ units sold).

In 2004, Kath & Kim's Party Tape was released in Australia under the Universal record label. It features 21 tracks including the full length version of the show's title theme, "The Joker" (as sung by Gina Riley) as well as Diana Ross and Lionel Richie's "Endless Love" and Donna Summer's "MacArthur Park".

Gina Riley – "The Joker"
Kath & Kim (Jane Turner and Gina Riley) – "Wine Time #1"
The Tubes – "Don't Touch Me There"
Bobby Hebb – "Sunny"
Kath & Kim – "Wine Time #2"
Diana Ross and Lionel Richie – "Endless Love"
Status Quo – "Roll Over Lay Down"
Kath & Kim – "Wine Time #3"
The Supremes – "Rhythm of Life"
Van McCoy – "The Hustle"
Yvonne Elliman – "If I Can't Have You"
Donna Summer – "MacArthur Park"
Kath & Kim – "Wine Time #4"
The Commodores – "Three Times a Lady"
Sérgio Mendes and Brasil '66 – "Day Tripper"
Kath & Kim – "Wine Time #5"
Yvonne Fair – "It Should Have Been Me"
Stephanie Mills – "Never Knew Love Like This Before"
Kath & Kim – "Wine Time #6"
Captain & Tennille – "Love Will Keep Us Together"
Kath & Kim – "Lady Bump"

Other media

Feature film

On 9 March 2011, Turner and Riley announced plans for a movie, in which, Kath, Kim, Kel, Brett, Sharon and Epponnee would head overseas on holiday. Contracts were written to finance the film's production under the working title of The Kath & Kim Filum, with the word 'film' deliberately misspelt with the letter 'u' in typical Kath and Kim yumour. However, the title Kath & Kimderella was ultimately used, and the film was released in Australia on 6 September 2012. It was directed by Ted Emery (director of the television series) and produced by Rick McKenna. The holiday scenes were shot in Positano, Italy and filming took a total of two weeks.

The film was released in Australian cinemas on 6 September 2012. It grossed in excess of $2.1 million in its first weekend on Australian movie screens.

20th Anniversary special
In July 2022, it was reported that Kath & Kim will be returning for a 10-minute special to commentate 20 years of the series. The special will showcase a countdown of celebrity guests and unseen clips that didn't feature in the series, as well as the cast discussing their favourite scenes. Celebrity guests for the special will include Mason Cox, Sonia Kruger and Celia Pacquola. The two specials, Kath and Kim: Our Effluent Life and Kath and Kim: 20 Preposterous Years, aired on 20 and 21 November 2022, respectively.

American adaptation 

Due to the success that Kath & Kim has achieved internationally, it was remade for US audiences by NBC. Riley and Turner served as executive producers on the US version. In this remake, actress Molly Shannon has taken the role of Kath Day, and Selma Blair the role of Kim. The character of Sharon does not appear at the insistence of Szubanski.

NBC chose Jason Ensler to direct. Michelle Nader developed the series for American television, which premiered in the United States as part of the Fall schedule of 2008. The series started to shoot in California in July 2008. NBC debuted the US adaptation on 9 October 2008, while Seven started screening it to Australian viewers on 12 October 2008. After airing only two episodes, Seven dropped the sitcom from their lineup due to poor ratings, only to bring it back several weeks later as a late-night schedule filler. In America, reviews were poor, but it averaged roughly around 5 to 7 million viewers per week, and was rewarded with a full season order in October 2008. On 19 May 2009, NBC announced that there would not be a second season of Kath & Kim.

Notes

References

External links

 Official Kath & Kim website
 Official BBC website
 Yahoo!7 website
 

2002 Australian television series debuts
2007 Australian television series endings
Australian Broadcasting Corporation original programming
Australian television sitcoms
English-language television shows
Literary duos
Logie Award for Most Outstanding Comedy Program winners
Mass media portrayals of the working class
Seven Network original programming
Television shows set in Melbourne
Working class in Australia
Television duos
City of Kingston (Victoria)